Jason Patrick Lobo (born 1969), is a male former athlete who competed for England.

Athletics career
He became the British champion in 1998 after winning the 800 metres British title.

He represented England in the 800 metres event, at the 1998 Commonwealth Games in Kuala Lumpur, Malaysia.

References

1969 births
Living people
English male middle-distance runners
Athletes (track and field) at the 1998 Commonwealth Games
Commonwealth Games competitors for England